San Pedro Department may refer to:

In Argentina
San Pedro Department, Jujuy
San Pedro Department, Misiones

In Ivory Coast
San-Pédro Department

In Paraguay
San Pedro Department, Paraguay

Department name disambiguation pages